Sylvia Lumasia Rasoha, also known as Sylvia Lumasia, is a Kenyan footballer who plays as a forward for Kibera Girls Soccer Academy and the Kenya women's national team.

International career
Lumasia capped for Kenya at senior level during the 2019 CECAFA Women's Championship.

See also
List of Kenya women's international footballers

References

Year of birth missing (living people)
Living people
Kenyan women's footballers
Women's association football forwards
Kenya women's international footballers